The South Wolcott Street Historic District in Casper, Wyoming is a  historic district covering about 22 residential blocks south of downtown.  The district is roughly bounded by S. Center St., E. Ninth St., S. Wolcott St., E. Seventh St., S. Beech St., and E. Thirteenth St.   It was listed on the National Register of Historic Places in 1988.

It included 154 contributing buildings.  Significant ones include:
Bryant Butler Brooks House, at 1208 South Wolcott Street, a red brick estate on two large lots, with a port cochere
1025 South Durbin Street, a white clapboarded house.

References

Historic districts on the National Register of Historic Places in Wyoming
National Register of Historic Places in Natrona County, Wyoming
Colonial Revival architecture in Wyoming
Tudor Revival architecture in the United States